Sodium chloride , commonly known as salt (although sea salt also contains other chemical salts), is an ionic compound with the chemical formula NaCl, representing a 1:1 ratio of sodium and chloride ions. With molar masses of 22.99 and 35.45 g/mol respectively, 100 g of NaCl contains 39.34 g Na and 60.66 g Cl. Sodium chloride is the salt most responsible for the salinity of seawater and of the extracellular fluid of many multicellular organisms. In its edible form, salt (also known as table salt) is commonly used as a condiment and food preservative. Large quantities of sodium chloride are used in many industrial processes, and it is a major source of sodium and chlorine compounds used as feedstocks for further chemical syntheses. Another major application of sodium chloride is de-icing of roadways in sub-freezing weather.

Uses
In addition to the familiar domestic uses of salt, more dominant applications of the approximately 250 million tonnes per year production (2008 data) include chemicals and de-icing.

Chemical functions
Salt is used, directly or indirectly, in the production of many chemicals, which consume most of the world's production.

Chlor-alkali industry

It is the starting point for the chloralkali process, the industrial process to produce chlorine and sodium hydroxide, according to the chemical equation
2 NaCl + 2 H2O ->[electrolysis] Cl2 + H2 + 2 NaOH

This electrolysis is conducted in either a mercury cell, a diaphragm cell, or a membrane cell. Each of those uses a different method to separate the chlorine from the sodium hydroxide. Other technologies are under development due to the high energy consumption of the electrolysis, whereby small improvements in the efficiency can have large economic paybacks. Some applications of chlorine include PVC thermoplastics production, disinfectants, and solvents.

Sodium hydroxide is extensively used in many different industries enabling production of paper, soap, and aluminium etc.

Soda-ash industry
Sodium chloride is used in the Solvay process to produce sodium carbonate and calcium chloride. Sodium carbonate, in turn, is used to produce glass, sodium bicarbonate, and dyes, as well as a myriad of other chemicals. In the Mannheim process, sodium chloride is used for the production of sodium sulfate and hydrochloric acid.

Standard
Sodium chloride has an international standard that is created by ASTM International. The standard is named ASTM E534-13 and is the standard test methods for chemical analysis of sodium chloride. These methods listed provide procedures for analyzing sodium chloride to determine whether it is suitable for its intended use and application.

Miscellaneous industrial uses
Sodium chloride is heavily used, so even relatively minor applications can consume massive quantities. In oil and gas exploration, salt is an important component of drilling fluids in well drilling. It is used to flocculate and increase the density of the drilling fluid to overcome high downwell gas pressures. Whenever a drill hits a salt formation, salt is added to the drilling fluid to saturate the solution in order to minimize the dissolution within the salt stratum. Salt is also used to increase the curing of concrete in cemented casings.

In textiles and dyeing, salt is used as a brine rinse to separate organic contaminants, to promote "salting out" of dyestuff precipitates, and to blend with concentrated dyes to standardize them. One of its main roles is to provide the positive ion charge to promote the absorption of negatively charged ions of dyes.

It is also used in processing aluminium, beryllium, copper, steel and vanadium. In the pulp and paper industry, salt is used to bleach wood pulp. It also is used to make sodium chlorate, which is added along with sulfuric acid and water to manufacture chlorine dioxide, an excellent oxygen-based bleaching chemical. The chlorine dioxide process, which originated in Germany after World War I, is becoming more popular because of environmental pressures to reduce or eliminate chlorinated bleaching compounds. In tanning and leather treatment, salt is added to animal hides to inhibit microbial activity on the underside of the hides and to attract moisture back into the hides.

In rubber manufacture, salt is used to make buna, neoprene and white rubber types. Salt brine and sulfuric acid are used to coagulate an emulsified latex made from chlorinated butadiene.

Salt also is added to secure the soil and to provide firmness to the foundation on which highways are built. The salt acts to minimize the effects of shifting caused in the subsurface by changes in humidity and traffic load.

Sodium chloride is sometimes used as a cheap and safe desiccant because of its hygroscopic properties, making salting an effective method of food preservation historically; the salt draws water out of bacteria through osmotic pressure, keeping it from reproducing, a major source of food spoilage. Even though more effective desiccants are available, few are safe for humans to ingest.

Water softening
Hard water contains calcium and magnesium ions that interfere with action of soap and contribute to the buildup of a scale or film of alkaline mineral deposits in household and industrial equipment and pipes. Commercial and residential water-softening units use ion-exchange resins to remove ions that cause the hardness. These resins are generated and regenerated using sodium chloride.

Road salt

The second major application of salt is for de-icing and anti-icing of roads, both in grit bins and spread by winter service vehicles. In anticipation of snowfall, roads are optimally "anti-iced" with brine (concentrated solution of salt in water), which prevents bonding between the snow-ice and the road surface. This procedure obviates the heavy use of salt after the snowfall. For de-icing, mixtures of brine and salt are used, sometimes with additional agents such as calcium chloride and/or magnesium chloride. The use of salt or brine becomes ineffective below .

Salt for de-icing in the United Kingdom predominantly comes from a single mine in Winsford in Cheshire. Prior to distribution it is mixed with <100 ppm of sodium ferrocyanide as an anti-caking agent, which enables rock salt to flow freely out of the gritting vehicles despite being stockpiled prior to use. In recent years this additive has also been used in table salt. Other additives had been used in road salt to reduce the total costs. For example, in the US, a byproduct carbohydrate solution from sugar-beet processing was mixed with rock salt and adhered to road surfaces about 40% better than loose rock salt alone. Because it stayed on the road longer, the treatment did not have to be repeated several times, saving time and money.

Freezing near this concentration is however so slow that the eutectic point of  can be reached with about 25 wt% of salt.

Environmental effects
Road salt ends up in fresh-water bodies and could harm aquatic plants and animals by disrupting their osmoregulation ability. The omnipresence of salt poses a problem in any coastal coating application, as trapped salts cause great problems in adhesion. Naval authorities and ship builders monitor the salt concentrations on surfaces during construction. Maximal salt concentrations on surfaces are dependent on the authority and application. The IMO regulation is mostly used and sets salt levels to a maximum of 50 mg/m2 soluble salts measured as sodium chloride. These measurements are done by means of a Bresle test.  Salinization (increasing salinity, aka freshwater salinization syndrome) and subsequent increased metal leaching is an ongoing problem throughout North America and European fresh waterways.

In highway de-icing, salt has been associated with corrosion of bridge decks, motor vehicles, reinforcement bar and wire, and unprotected steel structures used in road construction. Surface runoff, vehicle spraying, and windblown actions also affect soil, roadside vegetation, and local surface water and groundwater supplies. Although evidence of environmental loading of salt has been found during peak usage, the spring rains and thaws usually dilute the concentrations of sodium in the area where salt was applied. A 2009 study found that approximately 70% of the road salt being applied in the Minneapolis-St Paul metro area is retained in the local watershed.

Substitution
Some agencies are substituting beer, molasses, and beet juice instead of road salt. Airlines utilize more glycol and sugar rather than salt based solutions for de-icing.

Food industry and agriculture

Many microorganisms cannot live in a salty environment: water is drawn out of their cells by osmosis. For this reason salt is used to preserve some foods, such as bacon, fish, or cabbage.

Salt is added to food, either by the food producer or by the consumer, as a flavor enhancer, preservative, binder, fermentation-control additive, texture-control agent and color developer. The salt consumption in the food industry is subdivided, in descending order of consumption, into other food processing, meat packers, canning, baking, dairy and grain mill products. Salt is added to promote color development in bacon, ham and other processed meat products. As a preservative, salt inhibits the growth of bacteria. Salt acts as a binder in sausages to form a binding gel made up of meat, fat, and moisture. Salt also acts as a flavor enhancer and as a tenderizer.

In many dairy industries, salt is added to cheese as a color-, fermentation-, and texture-control agent. The dairy subsector includes companies that manufacture creamery butter, condensed and evaporated milk, frozen desserts, ice cream, natural and processed cheese, and specialty dairy products. In canning, salt is primarily added as a flavor enhancer and preservative. It also is used as a carrier for other ingredients, dehydrating agent, enzyme inhibitor and tenderizer. In baking, salt is added to control the rate of fermentation in bread dough. It also is used to strengthen the gluten (the elastic protein-water complex in certain doughs) and as a flavor enhancer, such as a topping on baked goods. The food-processing category also contains grain mill products. These products consist of milling flour and rice and manufacturing cereal breakfast food and blended or prepared flour. Salt is also used a seasoning agent, e.g. in potato chips, pretzels, cat and dog food.

Sodium chloride is used in veterinary medicine as emesis-causing agent. It is given as warm saturated solution. Emesis can also be caused by pharyngeal placement of small amount of plain salt or salt crystals.

Medicine

Sodium chloride is used together with water as one of the primary solutions for intravenous therapy. Nasal spray often contains a saline solution.

Firefighting

Sodium chloride is the principal extinguishing agent in fire extinguishers (Met-L-X, Super D) used on combustible metal fires such as magnesium, potassium, sodium, and NaK alloys (Class D). Thermoplastic powder is added to the mixture, along with waterproofing (metal stearates) and anti-caking materials (tricalcium phosphate) to form the extinguishing agent. When it is applied to the fire, the salt acts like a heat sink, dissipating heat from the fire, and also forms an oxygen-excluding crust to smother the fire. The plastic additive melts and helps the crust maintain its integrity until the burning metal cools below its ignition temperature. This type of extinguisher was invented in the late 1940s as a cartridge-operated unit, although stored pressure versions are now popular. Common sizes are  portable and  wheeled.

Cleanser
Since at least medieval times, people have used salt as a cleansing agent rubbed on household surfaces. It is also used in many brands of shampoo, toothpaste and popularly to de-ice driveways and patches of ice.

Optical usage
Defect-free NaCl crystals have an optical transmittance of about 90% for infrared light, specifically between 200 nm and 20 µm. They were therefore used in optical components (windows and prisms) operating in that spectral range, where few non-absorbing alternatives exist and where requirements for absence of microscopic inhomogeneities are less strict than in the visible range. While inexpensive, NaCl crystals are soft and hygroscopic – when exposed to the ambient air, they gradually cover with "frost". This limits application of NaCl to dry environments, vacuum sealed assembly areas or for short-term uses such as prototyping. Nowadays materials like zinc selenide (ZnSe), which are stronger mechanically and are less sensitive to moisture, are used instead of NaCl for the infrared spectral range.

Chemistry

Solid sodium chloride

In solid sodium chloride, each ion is surrounded by six ions of the opposite charge as expected on electrostatic grounds. The surrounding ions are located at the vertices of a regular octahedron. In the language of close-packing, the larger chloride ions (167 pm in size) are arranged in a cubic array whereas the smaller sodium ions (116 pm) fill all the cubic gaps (octahedral voids) between them. This same basic structure is found in many other compounds and is commonly known as the halite or rock-salt crystal structure. It can be represented as a face-centered cubic (fcc) lattice with a two-atom basis or as two interpenetrating face centered cubic lattices. The first atom is located at each lattice point, and the second atom is located halfway between lattice points along the fcc unit cell edge.

It also decreases with doping.

Atomic-resolution real-time video imaging allows visualization of the initial stage of crystal nucleation of sodium chloride.

Aqueous solutions

The attraction between the Na+ and Cl− ions in the solid is so strong that only highly polar solvents like water dissolve NaCl well.

When dissolved in water, the sodium chloride framework disintegrates as the Na+ and Cl− ions become surrounded by polar water molecules. These solutions consist of metal aquo complex with the formula [Na(H2O)8]+, with the Na–O distance of 250 pm. The chloride ions are also strongly solvated, each being surrounded by an average of six molecules of water. Solutions of sodium chloride have very different properties from pure water. From cold solutions, salt crystallises as the dihydrate NaCl·2H2O. In 2023, it was discovered that under pressure, sodium chloride can form the hydrates NaCl·8.5H2O and NaCl·13H2O.

pH of sodium chloride solutions
The pH of a sodium chloride solution remains ≈7 due to the extremely weak basicity of the Cl− ion, which is the conjugate base of the strong acid HCl. In other words, NaCl has no effect on system pH in diluted solutions where the effects of ionic strength and activity coefficients are negligible.

Stoichiometric and structure variants
Common salt has a 1:1 molar ratio of sodium and chlorine. In 2013, compounds of sodium and chloride of different stoichiometries have been discovered; five new compounds were predicted (e.g., Na3Cl, Na2Cl, Na3Cl2, NaCl3, and NaCl7). The existence of some of them has been experimentally confirmed at high pressures and other conditions: cubic and orthorhombic NaCl3, two-dimensional metallic tetragonal Na3Cl and exotic hexagonal NaCl. This indicates that compounds violating chemical intuition are possible, in simple systems under nonambient conditions.

Occurrence
Most of the world's salt is dissolved in the ocean.  A lesser amount is found in the Earth's crust as the water-soluble mineral halite (rock salt), and a tiny amount exists as suspended sea salt particles in the atmosphere.  These particles are the dominant cloud condensation nuclei far out at sea, which allow the formation of clouds in otherwise non-polluted air.

Production
Salt is currently mass-produced by evaporation of seawater or brine from brine wells and salt lakes. Mining of rock salt is also a major source. China is the world's main supplier of salt. In 2017, world production was estimated at 280 million tonnes, the top five producers (in million tonnes) being China (68.0), United States (43.0), India (26.0), Germany (13.0), and Canada (13.0). Salt is also a byproduct of potassium mining.

See also

 Biosalinity
 Edible salt (table salt)
 Halite, the mineral form of sodium chloride
 Health effects of salt
 Salinity
 Salting the earth
 Salt poisoning

References

Cited sources

External links

 Salt United States Geological Survey Statistics and Information
 
 Calculators: surface tensions, and densities, molarities and molalities of aqueous NaCl (and other salts)
 JtBaker MSDS

Alkali metal chlorides
Chlorides
Deliquescent substances
Household chemicals
Metal halides
Sodium compounds
Sodium minerals
Rock salt crystal structure
Ophthalmology drugs